Lapel High School is a public high school located in Lapel, Indiana.

See also
 List of high schools in Indiana

References

External links
 Official Website

Schools in Madison County, Indiana
Public high schools in Indiana
Educational institutions established in 1890
1890 establishments in Indiana